HD 125595 is a star with a close Neptunian companion in the southern constellation of Centaurus. With an apparent visual magnitude of 9.03, this star is too faint to be viewed with the naked eye. It is located at a distance of 92 light years from the Sun based on parallax measurements, and is drifting further away with a radial velocity of +4.5 km/s.

This is an ordinary K-type main-sequence star with a stellar classification of K4V(k), which indicates it is a small star that is generating energy at its core through hydrogen fusion. It is about eight billion years old and is spinning with a projected rotational velocity of 1.5 km/s, giving it a 37 day rotation period. The star shows a moderate level of chromospherically activity due to star spots or plagues. It is smaller, cooler, dimmer, and less massive than the Sun, but shows a higher atmospheric metallicity.

Planetary system
In 2018 an exoplanet companion was announced by the HARPS program, using the radial velocity method. It is a Neptune-mass object orbiting  from the host star with a period of 9.7 days.

See also 
 List of extrasolar planets

References 

K-type main-sequence stars
Planetary systems with one confirmed planet

Centaurus (constellation)
Durchmusterung objects
125595
070170